The Grande Prêmio de Cinema Brasileiro for Best Film, given by the Ministry of Culture (2000–2001) and Academia Brasileira de Cinema (2002–present), awards the best film in Brazil.

Winners and nominees
In the following table, the winner is marked in a separate colour.

2000s

2010s

References

Awards for best film